l'Autre is the debut album of Et Sans, an experimental Canadian group. It was released in November 2001 by Locust Music.

The entire album consists of one song, approximately 42 minutes and 17 seconds long, named after the album title.

Track listing 

 "l'Autre" – 42:17

Personnel

Et Sans 

 Roger Tellier-Craig – guitar, vocals
 Alexandre St-Onge – contrabass, vocals

Technical 

 Crys Cole – photography
 Dave Smith – producer
 Jace Lasek – producer
 Michael Gardiner – producer

Notes

External links 
 Locust Music Official Homepage

Et Sans albums
2001 debut albums
Locust Music albums